Adam Fredric Duritz (born August 1, 1964) is an American singer, best known as the frontman for the rock band Counting Crows, of which he is a founding member and principal composer. Since its founding in 1991, Counting Crows has sold over 20 million records, released seven studio albums that have been certified gold or platinum, and been nominated for two Grammy Awards and an Academy Award.

Duritz has recorded solo material of his own and has collaborated with other musical acts. He has also founded two record labels, E Pluribus Unum and Tyrannosaurus Records. His work scoring music for film has been recognized by the music industry, notably with an award from BMI for co-writing the song "Accidentally in Love" for the movie Shrek 2.

Career
Duritz and producer/guitarist David Bryson formed Counting Crows in San Francisco in 1991. When Gary Gersh of Geffen Records heard the band's demo tape, he was "blown away". A bidding war between nine different record labels broke out in February 1992. In April, the band—which, by that time, included other members—"signed a deal with Gersh and Geffen believed to be so lucrative that industry wags dubbed them Accounting Crows".

The band's first album, August and Everything After, charted within the top five of the Billboard 200, and the single "Mr. Jones" (1993) was a number-one hit in Canada. After the band performed as the music guest on Saturday Night Live, "Mr. Jones" jumped 40 spots in the charts. The album has been certified 7× Platinum by the Recording Industry Association of America. Six of the band's albums have charted on the Billboard 200 and four have been certified gold or platinum by the Recording Industry Association of America. Counting Crows was nominated for two Grammy Awards in 1994. The band also received a 2004 Academy Award nomination for the song "Accidentally in Love", which was included in the film Shrek 2.

Duritz has collaborated with The Wallflowers (led by Jakob Dylan) on the album Bringing Down the Horse on the track "6th Avenue Heartache"; with Ryan Adams on Gold and the song "Butterfly in Reverse" from Hard Candy; with Peter Stuart on Propeller and Daisy; with Live on V;, with Dashboard Confessional on the track "So Long, So Long" from Dusk and Summer and with Maria Taylor on the song "Waiting In Line."

Duritz also contributed the songs "Spin Around," "You Don't See Me," and "You're a Star" to the Josie and the Pussycats soundtrack that was performed by the film's fictional title band. Along with bandmates Dan Vickrey, Bryson, and Immerglück, Duritz co-wrote the song "Accidentally in Love" for the soundtrack of the movie Shrek 2, winning them each an award from BMI.

Duritz's lyrics have been described as "morose" and "tortured" and as "wordy introspection", while his vocals have been called "expressive".

In October 2018, Duritz co-founded the Underwater Sunshine Music Festival.

Duritz co-founded the record label E Pluribus Unum in 1997. Before the label was purchased by new ownership, Duritz had signed Joe 90, Gigolo Aunts, and Neilson Hubbard. In 2007, Duritz launched a record label called Tyrannosaurus Records. Debut artists on the label included Notar and Blacktop Mourning. , the label was defunct.

Duritz was executive producer for the film The Locusts and produced the ensemble comedy film Freeloaders. He appeared in the 2007 mockumentary film Farce of the Penguins.

Personal life
Duritz grew up in Baltimore, Maryland; Boston, Massachusetts; El Paso, Texas; and Berkeley, California. He is the son of Gilbert and Linda Duritz, both physicians. Duritz has a younger sister, Nicole. Duritz attended the prestigious Taft School, and graduated from the Head-Royce School in Oakland, California. He has Russian Jewish ancestry. Duritz attended University of California, Berkeley, but left college two credits short of a degree.

Duritz has a dissociative mental health issue. He disclosed this mental health issue publicly in 2008.

In August 2019, Duritz—who had "rocked voluminous dreadlocks" since Counting Crows was formed—revealed that he had shaved his head.

References

External links

 
 

1964 births
Taft School alumni
American male bloggers
American bloggers
American male singers
American people of Russian-Jewish descent
American rock pianists
American male pianists
American rock singers
American tenors
Capitol Records artists
Counting Crows members
Living people
Singers from California
Alternative rock singers
American alternative rock musicians
Musicians from Baltimore
Singers from Maryland
Jewish rock musicians
Songwriters from Maryland
20th-century American singers
20th-century American pianists
People with dissociative identity disorder